The 1867 Canadian federal election was held from August 7 to September 20, 1867, and was the first election for the new country of Canada. It was held to elect members representing electoral districts in the provinces of Nova Scotia, New Brunswick, Ontario and Quebec to the House of Commons of the 1st Canadian Parliament.  The provinces of Manitoba (1870) and British Columbia (1871) were created during the term of the 1st Parliament of Canada and were not part of this election.

Sir John A. Macdonald had been sworn in as prime minister by the Governor General, Lord Monck, when the new Canadian nation was founded on 1 July 1867. As leader of the Conservative Party of Canada (known as the Liberal-Conservative Party until 1873), he led his party in this election and continued as Prime Minister of Canada when the Conservatives won a majority of the seats in the election, including majorities of the seats (and votes) in the new provinces of Ontario and Quebec.

The Liberal Party of Canada won the second most seats overall, including a majority of the seats (and votes) in the province of New Brunswick.  The Liberals did not have a party leader in the election.  George Brown, who was the leader of the Liberal Party of Ontario, was considered the "elder statesman" of the national party. Brown ran concurrently for seats in the Legislative Assembly of Ontario and the House of Commons of Canada, and might well have been Prime Minister in the unlikely event that the Liberals prevailed over the Conservatives in the national election. Brown failed to win a seat in either body, and the national Liberals remained officially leaderless until 1873.

The Anti-Confederation Party, led by Joseph Howe, won the third most seats overall, based solely on a majority of seats (and votes) in the province of Nova Scotia. Their main desire was the reversal of the decision to join Confederation, which had become highly unpopular in that province.  The goals of the Anti-Confederation Members of Parliament (MPs) were openly supported by five of the Liberal MPs of New Brunswick.  The Anti-Confederation MPs sat with the Liberal caucus.  When the government in Britain refused to allow Nova Scotia to secede, a majority of the Anti-Confederation MPs (11 of 18) moved to the Conservatives.

Halifax was a two-member riding at the time of the election, while the City of Saint John was represented by its own district and the County of Saint John. The election in Kamouraska, Quebec was delayed due to rioting.

Election 

The first Canadian election took place without a uniform set of election laws to govern the selection of members to the House of Commons, an interim measure until Parliament could pass its own election laws, which did not come until 1885. Instead, the election was contested under the rules set by each individual province prior to confederation, and future elections would be contested under provincial rules until a time when federal parliament set their own rules. Because of this, voting rights were inconsistent, as was the method of casting a ballot.

The election took place over a six week period from August 7 to September 20, with electoral district polls closing at different dates throughout the period. Under the system each electoral district was required to be polled in one day, but the day did not have to be the same across all electoral districts. The exception to the extended polling period (often called "polling circuits") being Nova Scotia which abolished the practice of polling different districts on different days after excessive violence was reported in the 1843 election.

Franchise 
The basic general requirement to vote across provinces was the requirement to be a male British subject 21 years of age or older. Voting was conducted in Ontario, Quebec and Nova Scotia through oral vote which required an eligible elector to declare their choice. New Brunswick had adopted a form of secret ballot in 1855, where electors write the name of a candidate on a piece of paper and deposit the vote in a ballot box.

In all provinces, women and government employees including civil servants, judges, police and prosecutors were not permitted to vote. Indigenous individuals who met property criteria were excluded from voting eligibility in most provinces if they received a benefit paid by the government.

The Ontario elections laws were updated in 1866, with electors required to meet a property qualification of being an owner or tenant with a property value listed on the assessment roll of $600 in a city, $400 in a town, $300 in an incorporated village, and $100 in a township or police village. Furthermore, urban residents must prove an annual income of at least $250. An estimated 16.5 per cent of the population of Ontario was enfranchised for the 1867 election. In Quebec, the property qualification for being an owner was $300 in urban areas and $200 in rural areas, and a tenant required a rent of $30 in an urban area or $20 in a rural area. Nova Scotia's election laws were passed in 1863, and had a property qualification for owners or tenants of $150, and enfranchised persons with $300 of personal property. while New Brunswick had a property qualification for owners of $100 and an annual income of $400.

Electoral districts 

Electoral districts were set by the Constitution Act, 1867 on the principal of representation by population. The Act provided Quebec a minimum of 65 seats and seat allotment for the remainder of the country was based by dividing the average population of Quebec's 65 electoral districts to determine the number of seats for other provinces. The Act also specified that distribution and boundary reviews should occur after each 10 year census.

Most of the ridings in the four provinces that participated in this election elected just one member, but one riding, Halifax, elected two members, with each voter casting up to two votes (Plurality block voting).

Results 

Acclamations

The following MPs were acclaimed:
Ontario: 3 Conservative, 3 Liberal-Conservatives, 9 Liberals
Quebec: 14 Conservatives, 5 Liberal-Conservatives, 4 Liberals
New Brunswick: 1 Conservative, 3 Liberals
Nova Scotia: 4 Anti-Confederates

Vacancy

The election in Kamouraska, Quebec, was cancelled due to rioting at the polling places.  No member was elected for the riding until a by-election in 1869.

Results by province

See also 

List of elections in the Province of Canada
1st Canadian Parliament

References

Notes

Citations

Further reading

External links 
Map of electoral districts coloured for each party
 Ridings and candidates

Federal
1867
August 1867 events
September 1867 events